The 2014 Dongfeng Motor Wuhan Open was a professional women's tennis tournament played on hard courts. It was the first edition of the event and part of the WTA Premier 5 series of the 2014 WTA Tour. It took place at the Optics Valley International Tennis Center in Wuhan, China between 21 and 27 September 2014.

Points and prize money

Point distribution

Prize money

* per team

Singles main-draw entrants

Seeds

1 Rankings as of September 15, 2014.

Other entrants
The following players received wildcards into the singles main draw:
 Victoria Azarenka
 Kirsten Flipkens
 María Teresa Torró Flor
 Xu Shilin
 Zhang Kailin

The following players received entry from the qualifying draw:
 Timea Bacsinszky
 Zarina Diyas
 Marina Erakovic
 Jarmila Gajdošová
 Karin Knapp
 Francesca Schiavone
 Donna Vekić
 Stefanie Vögele

The following player received entry as a lucky loser:
 Annika Beck

Withdrawals
Before the tournament
 Victoria Azarenka (right foot injury) → replaced by  Annika Beck
  Li Na (retirement from professional tennis) → replaced by  Christina McHale
  Sloane Stephens → replaced by  Heather Watson

During the tournament
 Garbiñe Muguruza (gastritis)

Retirements
  Dominika Cibulková (left ankle injury)
  Ana Ivanovic (left thigh injury)
  Jelena Janković (back injury)
  Serena Williams (viral illness)
  Xu Shilin (heat illness)

Doubles main-draw entrants

Seeds

1 Rankings as of September 15, 2014.

Other entrants
The following pairs received wildcards into the doubles main draw:
  Dominika Cibulková  /  Kirsten Flipkens 
  Bethanie Mattek-Sands  /  Andrea Petkovic
  Wang Yafan  /  Zhu Lin
The following pair received entry as alternates:
  Tian Ran  /  Yang Zhaoxuan

Withdrawals
Before the tournament
  Dominika Cibulková (left ankle injury)
  Lucie Šafářová (viral illness)

During the tournament
  Garbiñe Muguruza (gastritis)

Retirements
  Bethanie Mattek-Sands (viral illness)

Champions

Singles

  Petra Kvitová defeated  Eugenie Bouchard, 6–3, 6–4

Doubles

  Martina Hingis /  Flavia Pennetta defeated  Cara Black/  Caroline Garcia, 6–4, 5–7, [12–10]

References

External links
Official Website

 
Wuhan Open
Wuhan Open
Wuhan Open
Wuhan Open